Luis Aguilar may refer to:

 Luis Aguilar (actor) (1918–1997), Mexican actor and singer
 Luis Aguilar (sailor) (born 1936), Mexican sailor
 Luis Aguilar Monsalve (born 1942), Ecuadorian writer and academic
 Luis Aguilar (swimmer) (born 1952), Costa Rican swimmer
 Luis A. Aguilar (born 1953), American lawyer and former U.S. government official
 Luis Aguilar (writer) (1969–2022), Mexican poet, essayist, narrator, and translator
 Luis Aguilar (soccer) (born 1984), American soccer defender